Chuknagar massacre was a massacre of Bengali Hindus committed by the Pakistan Army and local Razakars during the Bangladesh Liberation War in 1971. The massacre took place on 20 May 1971 at Dumuria in Khulna and it was one of the largest massacres during the war. According to local estimates, between 10,000 to 12,000 people were killed, though the exact number of persons killed in the massacre is not known. Academic Sarmila Bose, in her controversial book. dismisses claims that 10,000 were killed as "unhelpful", and argues that the reported number of attackers could have shot no more than several hundred people before running out of ammunition. The majority of people killed in the massacre were men, although an unknown number of women and children were murdered as well.

Massacre
Chuknagar is a small town at Dumuria of Khulna, adjacent to the Indian border. After the start of the war many people fled from Khulna and Bagerhat. They crossed Bhodra River and arrived at Chuknagar to cross the border using Satkhira Road. By 15 May 1971 large numbers of refugees from nearby localities gathered at Chuknagar, as rumors broke out of an impending Pakistani attack. On 20 May, around 10:00, a group of 10-30 Pakistani military personnel equipped with semi-automatic rifles and light machine guns came on around three trucks. They stopped at a place called Jhautala (then known as Pathkhola) at the left corner of the Chuknagar Bazaar. Then they opened fire on the Pathkhola grounds and later moved to Chuknagar Bazaar and continued firing until 15:00.

Many people drowned as they jumped into the river in a largely futile attempt to flee the carnage. Local people later disposed off the dead bodies by throwing them into the river.

Memorial

A memorial was built to pay homage to the people who died in the massacre. The memorial is called Chuknagar Shohid Smritishoudho or Chuknagar martyred memorial.

See also
 List of massacres in Bangladesh
 Jibondhuli

References

Further reading
 

Military history of Pakistan
1971 Bangladesh genocide
Massacres in 1971
Massacres of Bengali Muslims
Massacres of Bengali Hindus in East Pakistan
Persecution of Hindus
Persecution by Muslims
Massacres committed by Pakistan in East Pakistan
May 1971 events in Asia